In mathematics, the Kuramoto–Sivashinsky equation (also called the KS equation or flame equation) is a fourth-order nonlinear partial differential equation. It is named after Yoshiki Kuramoto and Gregory Sivashinsky, who derived the equation in the late 1970s to model the diffusive–thermal instabilities in a laminar flame front. The Kuramoto–Sivashinsky equation is known for its chaotic behavior.

Definition
The 1d version of the Kuramoto–Sivashinsky equation is

An alternate form is

This is the form used in fluid dynamics applications.

The Kuramoto–Sivashinsky equation can also be generalized to higher dimensions. In spatially periodic domains, one possibility is

Properties
The Cauchy problem for the 1d Kuramoto–Sivashinsky equation is well-posed in the sense of Hadamard—that is, for given initial data , there exists a unique solution  that depends continuously on the initial data.

Physically, since  is a velocity, this change of variable describes a transformation into a frame that is moving with constant relative velocity . On a periodic domain, the equation also has a reflection symmetry: if  is a solution, then  is also a solution.

Solutions
Solutions of the Kuramoto–Sivashinsky equation possess rich dynamical characteristics. Considered on a periodic domain , the dynamics undergoes a series of bifurcations as the domain size  is increased, culminating in the onset of chaotic behavior. In particular, the transition to chaos occurs by a cascade of period-doubling bifurcations.

Applications
Applications of the Kuramoto–Sivashinsky equation extend beyond its original context of flame propagation and reaction–diffusion systems. These additional applications include flows in pipes and at interfaces, plasmas, chemical reaction dynamics, and models of ion-sputtered surfaces.

See also
List of nonlinear partial differential equations
List of chaotic maps
Clarke's equation
Laminar flame speed

References

External links
 

Differential equations
Fluid dynamics
Combustion
Chaotic maps